Radoslav "Zaza" Bečejac (born 21 December 1941 in Žitište, Kingdom of Yugoslavia) is a Serbian midfielder who played for SFR Yugoslavia.

Best known for being member of the FK Partizan team that played the 1966 European Cup Final in Brussels versus Real Madrid, Bečejac is also known for the record transfer in the summer 1967 when Olimpija bought him from Partizan for YUD65 million. The astronomical transfer for SFR Yugoslavia at the time brought about changes in the FA ruling as a transfer cap of YUD12.5 million was instituted from then on.

External links
Profile on Serbian federation site

1941 births
Living people
People from Žitište
Yugoslav footballers
Serbian footballers
Yugoslav expatriate footballers
Yugoslavia international footballers
Association football midfielders
Yugoslav First League players
Categoría Primera A players
FK Partizan players
NK Olimpija Ljubljana (1945–2005) players
Independiente Santa Fe footballers
FK Proleter Zrenjanin players
Expatriate footballers in Colombia
Yugoslav expatriate sportspeople in Colombia